Chios is the main town and a former municipality on the island of Chios, North Aegean, Greece. Since the 2011 local government reform, it is part of the municipality Chios, of which it is a municipal unit. The municipal unit has an area of 22.823 km2. It is located on the eastern coast of the island facing the Turkish coastal town of Çeşme. The town has a population of 26,850 (2011) and is the administrative capital and main port of both the island and of the regional unit of Chios. Chios town is one of eight municipal units on the island.

The city is often locally referred to as Chora or Kastro ('castle') to distinguish it from the entirety of the island with which it shares the name.

North of Chios lies the suburb of Vrontados, while the Chios Island National Airport and town of Karfas lie a few kilometres south of the centre.

History
Originally the site of an ancient settlement, the town was first built at the north side of a natural harbour. By the 16th century, the Byzantine walled town had been further fortified by the Genoese rulers into a massive medieval castle, the "Kastro".

The current town has expanded out from the Kastro, and the port in the last 200 years. After the devastating earthquake of 1881, the town was substantially rebuilt in neoclassical style, although much of the quayside and outskirts are more modern. The promenade and buildings on it, architechnically were influenced by the nearby Smyrna on Asia minor coast. In 1885 the population was circa 13.000.

Although the population is relatively stable, the town continues to expand with suburbs being built to the north and south. Nevertheless, the centre of the town is still concentrated between the port and castle where the administration, several museums, the main shopping street "Aplotaria", and the municipal gardens lie.

Districts
 Aplotariá (Aplotaria Street)
 Agia Marina
 Bella Vista (promenade)
 Bournias
 Kastro
 Neapoli (Tabakika)
 Fragoparikia
 Vounaki (Vounakiou Square)
 Varvasi

Landmarks
 Archaeological Museum of Chios
 Byzantine Museum of Chios
 Castle of Chios
 Korais Library
 Palace of Giustiniani
 Maritime Museum of Chios
 Metropolitan Church of Chios (Agion Viktoron)
 Osmaniye Mosque
 Saint Nicholas Catholic Church

Gallery

References

External links
 Official website 

Populated places in Chios
Greek prefectural capitals
Port cities of the Aegean Sea
Greek city-states
Populated places in the ancient Aegean islands